Turkmenistan competed at the 2004 Summer Olympics in Athens, Greece, from 13 to 29 August 2004.

Athletics

Turkmen athletes have so far achieved qualifying standards in the following athletics events (up to a maximum of 3 athletes in each event at the 'A' Standard, and 1 at the 'B' Standard).

Men
Track & road events

Women
Field events

Key
Note–Ranks given for track events are within the athlete's heat only
Q = Qualified for the next round
q = Qualified for the next round as a fastest loser or, in field events, by position without achieving the qualifying target
NR = National record
N/A = Round not applicable for the event
Bye = Athlete not required to compete in round

Boxing

Turkmenistan sent two boxers to Athens through the FIBA Asian Championships and Olympic Qualification Tournament.

Judo

Turkmenistan has qualified a single judoka.

Shooting 

Turkmenistan has qualified a single shooter.

Men

Swimming

Men

Women

Weightlifting 

Turkmenistan has qualified a single weightlifter.

See also
 Turkmenistan at the 2002 Asian Games
 Turkmenistan at the 2004 Summer Paralympics

References

External links
Official Report of the XXVIII Olympiad

Nations at the 2004 Summer Olympics
2004
Summer Olympics